Nishinoshima (also spelt nishino-shima and nishi-no-shima), meaning "western island", may refer to several places in Japan, both actual islands or municipalities:

Nishinoshima, Shimane, town located on the island of Nishinoshima (Shimane)
Nishinoshima (Shimane), one of the Dōzen Islands in the Oki archipelago
Nishinoshima (Ogasawara), volcanic island 940 km south of Tokyo that is part of the Volcano Islands archipelago